Love Is Cinta is a 2007 Indonesian teen romantic drama film directed by Hanny Saputra and starring Irwansyah, Raffi Ahmad, Acha Septriasa and Nirina Zubir.

Cast
Raffi Ahmad
 Henidar Amroe
Irwansyah
 Juwita Maritsa
Tio Pakusadewo
 Andhika Pratama
Unique Priscilla
Acha Septriasa
Nirina Zubir

Plot
Ryan (Irwansyah) and Cinta (Acha Septriasa) are high school good friends who have a crush on each other but both of them have no courage to reveal their feelings. Upon graduation, Ryan was determined to tell Cinta about his feeling before he was going to US to continue his study. Despite all of his efforts, Ryan failed to make Cinta understand about his feeling because Cinta's stubbornness. When Ryan was about to leave the country, Cinta finally feel that she had to see the last of him before he left and headed to the airport. Same for Ryan, he rushed from the airport to meet Cinta just to end up in a horrific traffic accident. Ryan was killed when  he tried to save a little girl and the car behind him exploded. As his soul cannot come to rest, the angel of death granted him to live few more days on earth inside another person's body. The only problem are that body  belongs to a gay and no one believes him that he is Ryan especially Cinta. But at last, Cinta believe that the person is Ryan.

External links
 

2007 films
2000s Indonesian-language films
2007 romantic drama films
Films shot in Indonesia
Indonesian romantic drama films
2000s teen drama films
Indonesian teen drama films
Indonesian teen romance films
Films directed by Hanny Saputra